Lonnie Summers (August 2, 1915 – August 24, 1999), nicknamed "Carl", was an American Negro league infielder from the 1930s to the 1950s.

A native of Davis, Oklahoma, Summers attended Jacob Riis High School in Los Angeles, California. A strong hitter known for his powerful line drives, he made his Negro leagues debut in 1938 with the Baltimore Elite Giants. Summers played several years in the Mexican League, and served in the United States Army in World War II.

After his wartime service, Summers played for the Chicago American Giants, and was selected to play in the 1949 East–West All-Star Game. He also played several seasons in the minor leagues, including the 1952 and 1953 seasons with the San Diego Padres of the Pacific Coast League. Summers died in Inglewood, California in 1999 at age 84.

References

External links
 and Seamheads
 Lonnie Summers at Negro League Baseball Players Association

1915 births
1999 deaths
Baltimore Elite Giants players
Chicago American Giants players
United States Army personnel of World War II
African Americans in World War II
Baseball infielders
African-American United States Army personnel